The name Nowe Krzewo may refer to:

 Nowe Krzewo, Białystok County - village in Białystok County
 Nowe Krzewo, Łomża County - village in Łomża County
 Nowe Krzewo, Zambrów County - village in Zambrów County